The Luxburg-Carolath Cemetery, commonly known as El Cuadrado ("The Square") is a privately owned cemetery located in Maracaibo, Zulia, Venezuela. It is one of the oldest operating cemeteries in the country, and has over 10,000 interments.

History
The Cuadrado cemetery was the first designated burial site of the city of Maracaibo in modern times; it was officially opened on 12 November 1879 as church grounds, where bodies were traditionally buried, were becoming overcrowded. The cemetery was given landmark status in Maracaibo in 2003. Since then, some graves have become derelict or otherwise defaced, but there have been efforts made to preserve the site. Notable to the cemetery is its architecture, which spans various styles including Baroque, Neoclassical, and Eclectic, and the various notable people and families interred. In 2018, it was estimated that 10,630 bodies rest in the cemetery; the state of Zulia began building a museum on the site this year, about the cemetery and people buried there, which was also supported by the German Luxburg Carolath Foundation.

Notable burials
 Jesús Enrique Lossada
 Ismael Urdaneta
 Francisco Eugenio Bustamante
 Francisco Ochoa Bustamante
 Jesús María Portillo
 José Antonio Borjas Romero
 José Ramón Yépez
 Manuel Dagnino
 Antonio José Urquinaona
 Manuel Trujillo Durán
 Guillermo Quintero Luzardo
 Eduardo Mathyas Lossada
 Julio Árraga
 Udón Pérez
 Antonio Pulgar
 Humberto Fernández Morán
 Julio Árraga
 Antonio Borjas Romero
 Lucas Evangelista Rincón
 Manuel Belloso
 Rafael Belloso Chacín
 Fray Junípero de la Escalada
 Eduardo López Rivas
 Eduardo López Bustamante
 Joaquín Esteva Parra
 Eduardo Pérez Fabelo
  Kurt Nagel Von Jess

References

Sources

 Tarre Murzi, Alfredo: Biografía de Maracaibo (: Maracaibo Biography), Ed. Bodini S.A., Barcelona, Spain, 1986.
 El Zulia Ilustrado, Facsimile reproduction, Ed. Belloso Foundation, Maracaibo, Venezuela, 1965.
 Nava, Ciro: Centuria cultural del Zulia, Élite Editorial, Caracas, Venezuela, 1940.
 Nagel Von Jess, Kurt:Algunas familias maracaiberas (: Some Maracaibo families), University of Zulia Press, Maracaibo, Venezuela, 1989.
 Ocando Yamarte, Gustavo: Historia del Zulia (: The History of Zulia). Arte Editorial, Caracas, Venezuela, 1996.
 Gómez Espinosa, Antonio: Historia fundamental del Zulia (: Critical History of Zulia), Editor Jean Baissari, Maracaibo, Venezuela, 1984.
 Plumacher, Eugene H.: Memorias (: Memoirs). Ciudad Solar Editors, historic heritage of Zulia state, Maracaibo, Venezuela, 2003.

External links

 https://dialnet.unirioja.es/descarga/articulo/3899950.pdf
 http://biblioteca.clacso.edu.ar/Venezuela/ceshc-unermb/20170219023252/RPS44.pdf
 Cementerio “El Cuadrado”: ¿Podría ser una "mina de oro" sin explotar?

1529 establishments in the Spanish Empire
Art Nouveau cemeteries
Cemeteries in South America
Cemeteries in Venezuela
Cemetery vandalism and desecration
Maracaibo
National cemeteries